Erni Arneson (née Buchtrup; 12 September 1917 – 8 December 2006) was a Danish film actress. She appeared in 25 films between 1942 and 2006. She was born in Århus, Denmark and died in Copenhagen, Denmark.

Filmography
Baby på eventyr - 1942
Vi kunne ha' det så rart - 1942
Det kære København - 1944
I går og i morgen - 1945
Billet mrk. - 1946
Jeg elsker en anden - 1946
Ta', hvad du vil ha' - 1947
Mani - 1947
Mens porten var lukket - 1948
I de lyse nætter - 1948
I kongens klær - 1954
Min datter Nelly - 1955
Mig og min familie - 1957
Baronessen fra benzintanken - 1960
Trekanter - 1969
Tænk på et tal - 1969
Ballade på Christianshavn - 1971
I morgen, min elskede - 1971
Olsen-banden på sporet - 1975
Den kroniske uskyld - 1985
Sidste akt - 1987
Sort høst - 1993
Carlo og Ester - 1994
Sunes familie - 1997
Efter brylluppet - 2006

References

External links

1917 births
2006 deaths
Danish film actresses
People from Aarhus